Velká Hleďsebe is a municipality and village in Cheb District in the Karlovy Vary Region of the Czech Republic. It has about 2,300 inhabitants.

Administrative parts
Villages of Klimentov and Malá Hleďsebe are administrative parts of Velká Hleďsebe.

References

Villages in Cheb District